Euclera rubricincta is a species of moth in the subfamily Arctiinae first described by Hermann Burmeister in 1878. It is found in the Amazon region and Argentina.

References

Arctiinae